Carson Coffman (born  April 29, 1988) is a former professional football quarterback. Coffman was the starting quarterback for the Kansas State Wildcats in 2009 and 2010.  He took over the starting position after the departure of Josh Freeman, and again after the departure of Grant Gregory. He is the brother of Cameron Coffman, a 2011 high school quarterback prospect and Chase Coffman, former Missouri standout who formerly played tight end for the Seattle Seahawks and several other NFL teams. Carson is also the son of former Kansas State standout and NFL tight end Paul Coffman.

College career

Freshman (redshirt) (2006)
Coffman redshirted the 2006 season.

Junior (2009)
Coffman assumed the role of starting quarterback after Josh Freeman left one year early for the NFL Draft. Coffman struggled early in the 2009 season and eventually lost his starting role to Grant Gregory.  He ended the season with 863 passing yards, 2 touchdowns and 4 interceptions (QB rating of 121.4).  Though he was not the starting quarterback, he was still respected by his teammates and voted a team captain and player representative.

Senior (2010)
Coffman once again took over the role of starting quarterback after Grant Gregory exhausted his eligibility.  He beat out competition from Collin Klein and Sammy Lammur. For the second year in a row, he had a tremendous Spring Game, and was voted as a team captain and player representative for the second consecutive season. Coffman threw for 2,060 yards with 14 touchdowns compared to only 7 interceptions (quarterback rating of 143.1). Scout.com also ranked him as the #359 quarterback available in the 2011 NFL draft. Coffman will be remembered for his effort in the 2011 Sunflower Showdown where he had a quarterback rating of 231.6, leading the Wildcats to a 59–7 victory against the Kansas Jayhawks.  He also led the team to the 2010 Pinstripe Bowl.

College career statistics

Professional career
Coffman was rated the 26th best quarterback in the 2011 NFL Draft by NFLDraftScout.com.

Utah Blaze
For the 2012 season, Coffman served as the backup quarterback for the Arena Football League's Utah Blaze, serving as the backup behind league MVP Tommy Grady.  Coffman completed 3 of 10 passes for 29 yards, no touchdowns, and one interception.

Kansas City Renegades
For the 2013 season, Coffman signed with the Kansas City Renegades of the Champions Professional Indoor Football League.

Chicago Rush
Coffman signed with the Chicago Rush for the 2013 season.

Iowa Barnstormers
On September 10, 2013, Coffman was acquired in a dispersal draft by the Iowa Barnstormers. The Barnstormers traded J. J. Raterink to the Los Angeles Kiss to move up in the draft to acquire Coffman.

Spokane Shock
On January 6, 2015, Coffman was assigned to the Spokane Shock. With former Shock quarterback Erik Meyer leaving for the San Jose SaberCats, Coffman had to battle, and eventually beat Warren Smith, for the Shock's starting quarterback position.

AFL statistics

Stats from ArenaFan:

References

1988 births
Living people
People from Peculiar, Missouri
American football quarterbacks
Kansas State Wildcats football players
Utah Blaze players
Kansas City Renegades players
Chicago Rush players
Iowa Barnstormers players
Boston Brawlers players
Spokane Shock players